Expert Opinion on Drug Discovery is a monthly peer-reviewed medical journal publishing review articles on novel technologies involved in drug discovery. The editor-in-chief is David Janero from Northeastern University.

Abstracting and indexing 
The journal is abstracted and indexed in Chemical Abstracts, EMBASE/Excerpta Medica, and Science Citation Index Expanded.

External links 
 

Pharmacology journals
Publications established in 2006
Expert Opinion journals
Taylor & Francis academic journals